The Apprenticeship of Duddy Kravitz is a 1974 Canadian comedy-drama film directed by Ted Kotcheff and starring Richard Dreyfuss. It is based on the 1959 novel of the same name by Mordecai Richler.

Plot
Duddy Kravitz is a brash, restless young Jewish man growing up poor in Montreal. His cab driver father Max and his rich uncle Benjy are very proud of Duddy's older brother Lenny, whom Benjy is putting through medical school. Only his grandfather shows the motherless Duddy any attention.

Duddy gets a summer job as a waiter at a kosher resort hotel in the Laurentian Mountains. His hustle, energy, and coarse manners irritate condescending college student and fellow waiter Irwin. Irwin gets his girlfriend Linda, the daughter of the hotel's owner, to persuade Duddy to stage a clandestine roulette game. Unbeknownst to Duddy, the roulette wheel is crooked, and he loses his entire $300 earnings to Irwin and some hotel guests. The other waiters find out and make Irwin give back the money. Unaware of this, the hotel guests, led by Farber, feel bad and give him a further $500.

Duddy starts a romantic relationship with another hotel employee, French Canadian Yvette. One day, Yvette takes him on a picnic beside a lake. Duddy is stunned by the beauty of the setting, and his ambition crystallizes: taking to heart his grandfather's maxim that "a man without land is nobody", he decides he will buy all the property around the lake and develop it. Because Duddy is under 21, then the age of majority in Canada, and the current owners might not want to sell to a Jew, he gets Yvette to front for him.

Duddy sets out to raise the money he needs. He hires blacklisted alcoholic film director Friar to film weddings and bar mitzvahs. His first customer is Farber, who drives a hard bargain. If he does not like the result, he will not pay. Despite Friar's artistic pretensions, the film is a success, and more orders are quickly forthcoming.

However, when a piece of land comes up for sale, Duddy does not have enough money. He begs his father to get him an appointment with his friend Dingleman, "the Boy Wonder", a rich, successful businessman-cum-gangster who had equally humble beginnings. Dingleman turns down his request for a loan but later invites him to discuss his scheme on a train to New York. It turns out that Dingleman just wants a drug mule to unknowingly take the risk of smuggling heroin.

On the train, Duddy meets good-natured Virgil and offers to buy his pinball machines, which are illegal in the United States. When Virgil shows up, Duddy does not have enough money to pay him, so Duddy hires Virgil as a truck driver, even though he has epilepsy. Virgil has a seizure while driving and crashes; he is left paralyzed from the waist down. Duddy is distraught and guilt-ridden. Blaming Duddy, Yvette leaves him to care for Virgil.

Duddy becomes alarmed when Dingleman finds out about his lake. When the last piece of property Duddy needs comes on the market, Dingleman bids for it. Desperate, Duddy forges Virgil's signature on a cheque to buy the land, leading to a final rupture with Yvette and Virgil.

Undeterred, Duddy proudly takes Max, Lenny, and his grandfather to see his property. When Dingleman shows up to offer to raise the financing for its development, Duddy mocks him. Duddy's grandfather, however, refuses to pick out a plot for his farm, as Yvette told him what Duddy did to get it. Duddy tries but fails to reconcile with Yvette, and she tells him that she never wants to see him again. In the final scene, Duddy has risen far enough that he can run a tab at the local diner, and his father boasts about how his son made it.

Cast

Production
Lionel Chetwynd was commissioned by John G. Kemeny to write a script based on Mordecai Richler's novel The Apprenticeship of Duddy Kravitz. The first draft was sent to Richler, who then showed it to his friend Ted Kotcheff. Kotcheff said that he would direct the movie if Richler wrote the second draft of the script. The film was shot from 10 September to 14 November 1973, after $910,000 was spent. $300,000 came from the Canadian Film Development Corporation and the remainder was raised by Gerald Schneider. Miklós Lente was the director of photography for the first two weeks of filming, but was replaced by Brian West.

The film was actually Kotcheff's second adaptation of Richler's 1959 novel. In 1961, he had directed a television play for ITV's Armchair Theatre based on Kravitz, with Hugh Futcher in the title role.

American producer Samuel Z. Arkoff was approached to make the film, but wanted to turn Duddy into a Greek character.

Few Canadians were cast in major roles because the Canadian film industry was underdeveloped at that time.

Release
The Apprenticeship of Duddy Kravitz premiered at the Place des Arts on 11 April 1974, and was theatrically released the next day. The film grossed $60,000 at the Place Ville Marie and Towne Cinema one week after its release. The film was the most commercially successful English-language Canadian film ever made at the time of its release with a gross of $2.3 million in Canada. Including the U.S., the film earned theatrical rentals of $1.7 million. The CFDC made $334,888 from its investment in the film.

Legacy
Duddy Kravitz has an important place in Canadian film history due to its record gross, and has thus been described as a 'coming of age' for Canadian cinema. The film has been designated and preserved as a "masterwork" by the Audio-Visual Preservation Trust of Canada, a charitable non-profit organization dedicated to promoting the preservation of Canada’s audio-visual heritage. The Toronto International Film Festival ranked it in the Top 10 Canadian Films of All Time twice, in 1984 and 1993.<ref>"Top 10 Canadian Films of All Time", The Canadian Encyclopedia, 2012, URL accessed 28 April 2013.</ref>

In the period between shooting Duddy Kravitz and actually seeing the completed movie, Richard Dreyfuss was offered, and twice turned down, the role of Matt Hooper in Jaws; having read the script he decided that it was a film he would "rather watch than be in". After he had seen the final cut of Kravitz, however, Dreyfuss felt his performance was so bad that it could potentially end his movie career. Discovering that the role of Hooper had still not been cast, he jumped at it to ensure that he was safely under contract to make another movie before anybody at Universal Pictures heard any negative press about Kravitz''.

It was shown as part of the Cannes Classics section of the 2013 Cannes Film Festival.

Prizes
Berlin International Film Festival – Golden Bear Award
Canadian Film Awards – Film of the Year
Writers Guild of America Award for Best Comedy Adapted from Another Medium – (Mordecai Richler and Lionel Chetwynd)

Nominations
Academy Award for Best Adapted Screenplay – (Mordecai Richler and Lionel Chetwynd)
Golden Globe Award for Best Foreign Film

Stage adaptation
In 1984 in Edmonton, Alberta, The Apprenticeship of Duddy Kravitz was adapted into a musical. A 1987 adaptation was directed by Austin Pendleton and premiered in Philadelphia. A newly updated version of the musical had its debut in Montreal in 2015 with music by Alan Menken, book and lyrics by David Spencer, and directed by Pendleton.

References

Works cited

External links

Canadian Film Encyclopedia
Canadian Feature Film Database
Video clip for selection as MasterWorks Recipient of 2002 by the Audio-Visual Preservation Trust of Canada

1974 films
1970s coming-of-age comedy-drama films
Canadian coming-of-age comedy-drama films
English-language Canadian films
1970s English-language films
Films about Jews and Judaism
Films based on Canadian novels
Films based on works by Mordecai Richler
Films directed by Ted Kotcheff
Films scored by Stanley Myers
Films set in Montreal
Films shot in Montreal
Jewish Canadian films
Best Picture Genie and Canadian Screen Award winners
Golden Bear winners
Paramount Pictures films
Films produced by John Kemeny
1974 comedy films
1974 drama films
1970s Canadian films